The 2018 season is Global Cebu's 2nd season in the top flight of Philippines football.

Competitions

Overview

Philippines Football League

Regular season

Note:
 a Because of the ongoing works in the Marikina Sports Complex, the team will play its first few league games at the Biñan Football Stadium and Rizal Memorial Stadium and will have to groundshare with Stallion Laguna and Meralco Manila, respectively.
 b Because of the ongoing works in the Cebu City Sports Complex, the team will play its first few league games at the Rizal Memorial Stadium in Manila and will have to groundshare with Meralco Manila.
 c The home stadium of the club is located in Bantay, Ilocos Sur, a nearby town of Vigan. For administrative and marketing purposes, the home city of Ilocos United is designated as "Vigan"
 d Because of the unavailability of the Cebu City Sports Complex, the match was played instead in Rizal Memorial Stadium, Manila.

Final Series

 The game is considered as a Home Game for Global Cebu. Game will be played in RMS due to unavailability of Global's home stadium, the Cebu City Sports Complex.

AFC Champions League

Preliminary rounds

AFC Cup

Group stage

Knockout stage

ASEAN Zonal Semifinal

Home United won 5–4 on aggregate.

Singapore Cup

Squad

League squad

Transfer

Preseason transfer

In

Out

Mid-season transfer

In

Out

References

Global Makati F.C. seasons
Global Cebu 2017
Global Cebu 2017